The 1943 Major League Baseball season was contested from April 20 to October 11, 1943. The St. Louis Cardinals and New York Yankees were the regular season champions of the National League and American League, respectively. In a rematch of the prior year's postseason, the Yankees then defeated the Cardinals in the World Series, four games to one.

In order to conserve rail transport during World War II, the 1943 spring training sites was limited to an area east of the Mississippi River and north of the Ohio River. Spring training sites included the Chicago White Sox in French Lick, Indiana; the Washington Senators in College Park, Maryland; and the Yankees in Asbury Park, New Jersey.

Awards and honors
Most Valuable Player
Spud Chandler (AL) – P, New York Yankees
Stan Musial (NL) – 1B, St. Louis Cardinals
The Sporting News Player of the Year Award
Spud Chandler – P, New York Yankees
The Sporting News Most Valuable Player Award
Spud Chandler (AL) – P, New York Yankees
Stan Musial (NL) – 1B, St. Louis Cardinals
The Sporting News Manager of the Year Award
Joe McCarthy (AL) – New York Yankees

Standings

American League

National League

Postseason

Bracket

Managers

American League

National League

Home Field Attendance

See also
 1943 All-American Girls Professional Baseball League season

Notes

External links 
1943 Major League Baseball season schedule at Baseball Reference

References 

 
Major League Baseball seasons